Ana Majhenić (born 16 June 1981) is a Croatian film and stage actress.

Filmography

Film

Television

References

External links
 

1981 births
Living people
Actresses from Zagreb
Croatian actresses
Croatian film actresses
Croatian stage actresses